David Phillip Bamford (born 29 March 1976 in Melbourne, Victoria) is a former Australian badminton player.

On 22 June 2000, Bamford was awarded the Australian Sports Medal for badmintoning achievements.

References

External links
 
 
 
 
 
 
 

Australian male badminton players
Badminton players at the 2000 Summer Olympics
Olympic badminton players of Australia
Sportspeople from Melbourne
Recipients of the Australian Sports Medal
1976 births
Living people
Commonwealth Games competitors for Australia
Badminton players at the 1998 Commonwealth Games